The Nicholls Colonels women's track and field team represents Nicholls State University in NCAA Division I women's indoor and outdoor track and field. The team is a member of the Southland Conference. The teams are coached by Stefanie Slekis.

See also
Nicholls Colonels

References

External links